Chan Mya Nyein (born 1987 in Yangon) is a Burmese singer and model known professionally as Chan Chan. She has released three solo albums to date. She was also one of the judges in Myanmar Idol.

Melody World 
Chan Chan was the first runner-up of Melody World singing contest organized by Myawaddy TV. Her winning song, "Thachin Letsaung" is one of the tracks included in the album named The Best of Melody World 2007. "Thachin Letsaung" became her debut song and gained her extra fame as a singer in Myanmar.

Career 
Chan Chan released her first album, Tage So Yin Achit Be Lo De, shortly after winning the Melody World contest. "Love Is All We Need Indeed", the hit song of this album is the cover version of a famous Chinese song. She was awarded "Best-selling album – Female" by City FM in 2010. In 2011, she was titled the "Most popular female singer of the year" by City FM. Her second album Theik Chit De, Ayan Mon De was released in early 2012. 
On June and July 2019 she held a United States tour thorough the main cities of the country.

She was involved as a Judge in Myanmar Idol Season 1 (2015–2016).

Brand ambassadorship
She represented the Paul Mitchell hairstyle products brand in 2009, and is currently the Brand Ambassador for Banchack Lubricant in Thailand.

Political activities
On 2 April 2021, in the aftermath of the 2021 Myanmar coup d'état, warrants for her arrest were issued under section 505 (a) of the Myanmar Penal Code by the State Administration Council for speaking out against the military coup. Along with several other celebrities, she was charged with calling for participation in the Civil Disobedience Movement (CDM) and damaging the state's ability to govern, with supporting the Committee Representing Pyidaungsu Hluttaw, and with generally inciting the people to disturb the peace and stability of the nation.

Personal life 
Chan Chan is the youngest daughter out of 4 siblings. Chan Chan began her show business career in 2007 when she won second place for the Melody World singing contest. In 2013, she won the 'People's Choice Award' and 'First Runner-up' in People Magazine modelling contest. She married in 2013.
The Wedding Reception of Chan Chan and Phone Thike was held at the Saint Mary's Cathedral in Botahtaung Township, Yangon on 17 July 2013. Chan Chan and Phone Thike also hosted with a Dinner Party at the same venue after the wedding ceremony. They have one lovely daughter named Mya Moe Gin Gar. They are divorced in July 2017 by legally.

Discography 
 Ta Kal So Yin A Chit Pal Lo Tal (2010)
 Thape Chit Tal, A Yann Mone Tal (2012)
 Eain Met (2014)
 Tho Chit Nay Tone Bal (2017)

References

External links 

21st-century Burmese women singers
Living people
1987 births
Melody World participants